Dyzio can refer to:
Dyzio, a model Dilophosaurus in the Geological Museum of the Polish Geological Institute in Warsaw
Dyzio, a character from The Lingo Show, a kids' TV show
The Polish name of Dewey Duck, a Walt Disney cartoon character